Amoeba Culture is a South Korean independent record label established in 2006 by Dynamic Duo and Go Kyung-min. The label is home to prominent artists such as Dynamic Duo, Rhythm Power, and Ha:tfelt. The label had the third largest sales among Korean record labels in 2015.

History
Amoeba Culture was founded in August 2006 by Dynamic Duo members Gaeko and Choiza, as well as current CEO Go Kyung-min. The label held open auditions in late 2007 in order to expand its roster. In 2008, composer and producer Primary and hip hop duo Supreme Team joined the company.

In 2011 the label released a series of toy figurines and started the "AMOEBAHOOD" project to promote exhibits and other cultural art projects. They also established the Amoeba Culture recording studio in October 2011. In 2012 the label held the first "Amoebahood Concerts" at Daegu Exco and KBS Busan Hall in February, as well as the House of Blues in LA and the Showbox at the Market in Seattle in April with Kero One. Zion.T also announced that he had signed with the label that summer.

In 2013 all of the label's artist participated in the 'NOWeekend' project which culminated in an album. The group also held the "2013 Amoebahood Concerts" on March 16 and 17. On July 19, 2013, Supreme Team disbanded when member E-Sens's contract ended. That summer E-Sens released tracks alleging the company had offered him a slave contract and that they had stolen money which the label denied. In January 2014 the other former Supreme Team member, Simon D, left the label as well.

In November 2017, CJ E&M acquired Amoeba Culture. CJ E&M official stated that, "We are investing to support the development of hip-hop music and free creative activities by artists".

Controversies

Plagiarism accusations against Primary
For the 2013 Infinity Challenge Music Festival, Primary collaborated with Park Myeong-su and label mate Gaeko (Dynamic Duo) for the song "I Got C". Later, netizens noticed similarities between "I Got C" and Dutch singer Caro Emerald's "Liquid Lunch." Rumors of plagiarism later followed.

In an interview by Seoul Shinmun NTN's "Dispatch," Caro Emerald's production team member David Schreurs said, "[Primary] uses our music as a template to create his own, which is an honor but on some songs he’s just going too far with it. I would like to say he should start trusting his own talent, because he sure is a good producer.” As a result, Munhwa Broadcasting Corporation (MBC), the network behind "Infinity Challenge," as well as KT Music, the publisher of the album and songs from the "2013 Infinity Challenge Music Festival," ceased online sales of "I Got C."

Another Primary composition, Park Ji-yoon's Mr. Lee (featuring San E) was also later accused of plagiarism.

2013: "The Control Diss Phenomenon"
 July 19 – E-Sens (Supreme Team) left Amoeba Culture.
 August 12 – American hip hop artist Big Sean released a promotional single called "Control", with a verse from Kendrick Lamar that called on all hip hop artists to "step up and save hip hop".
 August 21 – Swings, the Korean American rapper affiliated with Illest Konfusion, UPT and Overclass, released the diss track "King Swings" through the YouTube channel of his agency at the time, Brand New Music. It was met with responses from Ugly Duck, Takeone and Deepflow.
 August 22 – E-Sens shocked the Korean hip hop community when he released "You Can't Control Me", dissing his former agency and label mate Gaeko (Dynamic Duo).
 August 23 – Swings released another diss, "Hwang Jung-min (King Swings Part 2)". He dissed Simon Dominic (Supreme Team) this time.
 August 24 – Gaeko broke his silence and released "I Can Control You", then E-Sens responded with "True Story". Meanwhile, Simon Dominic answered back at Swings through "Control".
 August 26 – Swings lashed back at Simon Dominic with "New World". Meanwhile, Amoeba Culture issued a statement saying "it respects the opinions of its artists and will let them handle it themselves (in regards to Gaeko and Simon Dominic's disses)".
 August 27 – The exchange of diss tracks came to an end.

Artists

Groups
Dynamic Duo

Soloists
HA:TFELT (핫펠트)
Snzae (선재)
SOLE (쏠)
THAMA (따마)
Uhm Jung-hwa (엄정화)
Huh! (허성현)

Former artists 
0CD
J-Tong
Supreme Team (2009–2013)
Simon Dominic (2009–2013)
E-Sens (2009–2013)
Zion.T (2013–2016)
Crush (2014–2019)
Bang Jae-min (2017-2019)
Primary (2008–2020)
Rhythm Power (2010-2020)

Discography

References

External links

Labels distributed by CJ E&M Music and Live
Labels distributed by Kakao M
Talent agencies of South Korea
South Korean hip hop record labels